Awi Federgruen (born 1953, in Geneva) is a Dutch/American mathematician and operations researcher and Charles E. Exley Professor of Management at the Columbia University Graduate School of Business and affiliate professor at the university's Fu Foundation School of Engineering and Applied Science.

Biography 
Federgruen received his BA from the University of Amsterdam in 1972, where he also received his MS in 1975 and his PhD in Operations Research in 1978 with a thesis entitled "Markovian Control Problems, Functional Equations and Algorithms" under supervision of Gijsbert de Leve and Henk Tijms.

Federgruen started his academic career as Research Fellow at the Centrum Wiskunde & Informatica, Amsterdam early 1970s, and was faculty member of the University of Rochester, Graduate School of Management. In 1979 he was appointed Professor at the Columbia University. In 1992 he was named the first Charles E. Exley Jr. Professor of Management, and holds the Chair of the Decision, Risk and Operations (DRO) Division. From 1997 to 2002 he was Vice Dean of the University. He serves as a principal consultant for the Israel Air Force, in the area of logistics and procurement policies.

Federgruen has supervised many PhD students; recent graduates include Yusheng Zheng (at Wharton Business School, University of Pennsylvania), Ziv Katalan (at Wharton Business School, University of Pennsylvania),  Fernando Bernstein (Fuqua Business School, Duke university), Joern Meissner (Kuehne Logistics University in Hamburg, Germany), Gad Allon (Kellogg School of Management, Northwestern University), Nan Yang (Olin Business School, Washington University),  Margaret Pierson (Harvard Business School), Yossi AVIV (Olin Business School, Washington University), Lijian Lu (HKUST Business School) and Zhe Liu (Imperial College Business School, Imperial College London), see 

Federgruen was awarded the 2004 Distinguished Fellowship Award by the Manufacturing, Service and Operations Management society for Outstanding Research and Scholarship in Operations Management; and also the Distinguished Fellow, Manufacturing and Service Operations Management Society.
He was elected to the 2009 class of Fellows of the Institute for Operations Research and the Management Sciences.

Work 
Federgruen is known for his work in the development and implementation of planning models for supply chain management and logistical systems. His work on scenario planning is widely cited, the field has gained prominence as computers now allow the processing of large masses of complex data.

His work on supply chain models has wide applications in, for example, flu vaccine and  the risks of relying too heavily on a single vaccine supplier.

He is also an expert on  applied probability models and dynamic programming. In the wake of Hurricane Katrina, Federgruen was quoted on the subject of applying predictive models to minimize risk in disaster situations.

Publications 
Books, a selection:
 1978. Markovian Control Problems, Functional Equations and Algorithms. Doctorate thesis University of Amsterdam.

Articles, a selection:

References

External links 
 Awi Federgruen at Columbia
A. Federgroen at the University of Amsterdam Album Academicum website

Living people
20th-century American mathematicians
21st-century American mathematicians
American business theorists
American operations researchers
Dutch mathematicians
University of Amsterdam alumni
Columbia University faculty
Year of birth uncertain
Dutch emigrants to the United States
1953 births
Fellows of the Institute for Operations Research and the Management Sciences